The Ruakākā River is a river of the Northland Region of New Zealand's North Island. It flows north before turning east and finally south, reaching the sea at the township of Ruakākā on Bream Bay.

See also
List of rivers of New Zealand

References

Whangarei District
Rivers of the Northland Region
Rivers of New Zealand